Simulium yahense is a species of black flies found in West African rain forests. Their larval stages are found in "smaller, more shaded, cooler breeding waters." One particular group, now eradicated, was found only on the island of Bioko, and was an extremely effective vector for the parasitic worm Onchocerca volvulus that causes onchocerciasis, or "river blindness".

References 

yahense
Insect vectors of human pathogens